The 1967 Kilkenny Senior Hurling Championship was the 73rd staging of the Kilkenny Senior Hurling Championship since its establishment by the Kilkenny County Board in 1887. The championship began on 25 June 1967 and ended on 12 November 1967.

Bennettsbridge entered the championship as the defending champions.

On 12 November 1967, Bennettsbridge won the championship after a 3–10 to 1–04 defeat of Thomastown in the final. It was their 11th championship title overall and their second title in succession.

Bennettsbridge's Paddy Moran was the championship's top scorer with 2–19.

Team changes

To Championship

Promoted from the Kilkenny Junior Hurling Championship
 Galmoy

From Championship

Regraded to the Kilkenny Junior Hurling Championship
 Knocktopher

Results

First round

Second round

Semi-finals

Final

Championship statistics

Top scorers

Overall

In a single game

References

Kilkenny Senior Hurling Championship
Kilkenny Senior Hurling Championship